With the highway construction programme in its final stages, the Croatian Parliament has passed a bill to build its first high-speed line, a new Botovo–Zagreb–Rijeka line, with an initial maximum planned speed of 250 km/h. Initially, however, the train will not exceed 200 km/h due to a signaling system which can only accommodate speeds up to 200 km/h. The cost of the new line is estimated at 9,244,200,000  kuna (approx. 1.6 bil USD). The project will include the modernisation of the current Botovo-Zagreb line and a construction of a completely new line between Zagreb and Rijeka.

Also, the Pan-European Corridor X, running from the Slovenian border, through Zagreb, to Serbian border is a likely future candidate for the high-speed extension to this line. It is the most modern Croatian track, already initially built for 160 km/h and fully electrified and connects most branch lines in Croatia, Croatian cities of Slavonski Brod and Vinkovci, and Pan-European Corridor Vc towards Osijek and Bosnia and Herzegovina.

References